Seliminovo is a village in Bulgaria.

References

Villages in Sliven Province